Tilath, is a bhumihar village in Piro block of Bhojpur district, Bihar, India. It is located northeast of Piro. As of 2011, its population was 2,886, in 500 households.

References 

Villages in Bhojpur district, India